Quake done Quick is a series of collaborative speedruns and machinima movies in which the video game Quake, its mission packs, and related games are completed as quickly as possible without the use of cheats. Most playthroughs use shortcuts or tricks, such as bunny hopping and rocket jumping, in order to achieve a faster time. These movies are available in the game engine's native demo format and in various multimedia formats such as AVI.

Formats

Collaborative speedruns 
The speedruns featured in Quake done Quick are collaborative speedruns.  Unlike traditional speedruns, in which a single player (or "runner") attempts to complete the entire game as quickly as possible, collaborative speedruns combine the work of multiple runners who each complete a specific part of the game.  Breaking the speedrun into small pieces allows runners to focus their practice on a small portion of the game, which is why collaborative speedruns often feature faster times than traditional ones. For Quake done Quick, runners contribute to the speedrun by submitting demos of individual levels.

Machinima 
Some of the speedruns have been turned into machinima movies.  These productions feature custom skins, models, scripts, and "recams", which show the run from cinematic camera perspectives rather than the game's default first-person view. This is done for entertainment purposes, and there is always an unedited first-person perspective recording available as documentation of the runners' efforts.

Popularity 
The machinima movies of Quake done Quick are far more popular than the game's conventional speedruns. Some of them, most notably the movies that feature speedruns on the game's hardest difficulty level, have been distributed with gaming magazines and posted on news sites. After the creation of the Quake done Quick with a Vengeance movie, Slashdot featured the movie on its front page.

Of all the Quake done Quick speedruns, Quake done Quick with a Vengeance is the most popular. It features the entire game completed in 0:12:23 on “Nightmare” difficulty (the hardest difficulty level). This run succeeded Quake done Quicker and the original Quake done Quick movie, in which the game was completed in 0:16:35 and 0:19:49, respectively.

Techniques 
The Quake done Quick with a Vengeance speedrun is over four minutes faster than its predecessor.  This feat surpassed the initial expectations of the runners and was largely made possible by the discovery of bunny hopping. This technique enabled runners to move much more quickly through levels and allowed them to save rockets and grenades for other tricks, since certain parts of the game could now be completed without them.

Releases 
This is a list of releases in the Quake done Quick series.  The most notable ones have been annotated. Unlike conventional speedrunning records, the individual players who worked on these runs are not listed since there are always many different players working on these projects.  Instead, the records are usually attributed to the “Quake done Quick team”, and details on who made which portion of the run can be found in the runs' descriptions.

More details can be found on the official Quake done Quick website (see ).

1 preceded by Quake done Quick With A Vengeance
2 preceded by Quake done Quicker and Quake done Quick
3 originally 0:14:06, but later improved to its current time
4 preceded by Quake done 100% Quick lite
5 the Quake done Quick website notes that this is currently their best movie
6 available as add-on to Scourge done Slick
7 this run is for an independently produced and freely available Quake map pack
8 preceded by Doom done Quick 
9 this run is for an independently produced and freely available Doom map pack

See also 
 List of video games notable for speedrunning
 Speed Demos Archive

Notes

References

External links 

Video game gameplay
Machinima based on a Quake series engine
Speedrunning